The Government of Singapore consists of several departments, known as ministries and statutory boards in Singapore. Ministries are led by a member of the Cabinet and deal with state matters that require direct political oversight. The member of the Cabinet heading the ministry is known as the minister, who is supported by a junior minister known as minister of state in Singapore. The administrative management of the ministry is led by a senior civil servant known as permanent secretary.

Ministry of Culture, Community and Youth (MCCY)

Committees/Councils
 Hindu Advisory Board
 Hindu Endowments Board
 National Integration Council
 Sikh Advisory Board

Departments/Divisions 
 Arts and Heritage Division
 Charities Unit
 Community Relations and Engagement Division
 Corporate Communications Division
 Development and Corporate Administration Division
 Human Resource and Organisation Development
 Information Technology Division
 Internal Audit Division
 Legal Unit
 National Youth Council
 Registry of Co-operative Societies and Mutual Benefit Organisations
 Resilience and Engagement Division
 Partnerships Project Office
 Sports Division
 Strategic Planning and Finance Division
 Youth Division

Statutory boards 
 Majlis Ugama Islam Singapura
 National Arts Council
 National Heritage Board
 People's Association
 Sport Singapore

Ministry of Defence (MINDEF)

Departments/Divisions
 Centre for Strategic Infocomm Technologies
 Defence Management Group
 Defence Policy Group
 Defence Technology Collaboration Office
 Defence Cyber Organisation
 Future Systems and Technology Directorate
 Industry & Resources Policy Office
 Internal Audit Department
 MINDEF Tele-Services
 MINDEF/SAF Manpower Centres
 SAF Formations
 Singapore Army
 Republic of Singapore Navy (RSN)
 Republic of Singapore Air Force (RSAF)
 SAF Military Police Command
 Army Senior Specialist Staff Officers
 Centre of Excellence for Soldier Performance
 SAF Sports Association (SAFSA)
 Singapore Armed Forces
 The Joint Staff
 Foreign Military Liaison Branch
 Headquarters Medical Corps
 Army Headquarters
 Navy Headquarters
 Air Force Headquarters
 SAFTI Military Institute Headquarters
 Singapore Maritime Crisis Centre
 Safety and Systems Review Directorate
 Technology Strategy and Policy Office
 Military Security Department
 Training Schools
 Basic Military Training Centre (BMTC)
 Officer Cadet School (OCS)
 Specialist Cadet School (SCS)
 Specialist and Warrant Officer Advanced School

Statutory board
 Defence Science and Technology Agency (DSTA)

Ministry of Education (MOE)

Departments/Divisions
 Communications and Engagement Group
 HR Group
 Academy of Singapore Teachers
 Curriculum Planning & Development Division 1
 Curriculum Planning & Development Division 2
 Educational Technology Division
 Finance and Procurement Division
 Higher Education Group
 Infrastructure and Facility Services 
 Information Technology Division
 Planning Division
 Research and Management Information Division
 Schools Division
 Special Education Needs Division
 Student Placement and Services Division
 Student Development Curriculum Division
 Curriculum Policy Office
 English Language Institute of Singapore
 Internal Audit
 Legal Services
 Physical Education and Sports Teacher Academy 
 Singapore Teachers Academy for the Arts

Universities 
 National University of Singapore
 Nanyang Technological University
 Singapore Institute of Technology
 Singapore Management University
 Singapore University of Social Sciences
 Singapore University of Technology and Design

Statutory boards
 Institute of Technical Education
 ISEAS–Yusof Ishak Institute
 Nanyang Polytechnic
 Ngee Ann Polytechnic
 Republic Polytechnic
 Science Centre Singapore
 Singapore Examinations and Assessment Board
 Singapore Polytechnic
 SkillsFuture Singapore
 Temasek Polytechnic

Ministry of Finance (MOF)

Departments/Divisions
 Accountant-General's Department
 Corporate Development
 Corporate Services Directorate
 Economic Programmes Directorate
 Fiscal Policy Directorate
 Free Trade Agreement
 Goods and Services Tax Board of Review
 Governance and Investment Directorate
 Income Tax Board of Review
 Internal Audit Unit
 Managing for Excellence Directorate
 Singapore Customs
 Social and Security Programmes
 Street and Building Names Board
 Valuation Review Board
 Vital.org

Statutory boards
 Accounting and Corporate Regulatory Authority
 Inland Revenue Authority of Singapore (IRAS)
 Singapore Accountancy Commission (SAC)
 Tote Board

Ministry of Foreign Affairs (MFA)

Directorates in Headquarters
 Americas Directorate
 ASEAN Directorate
 Australia, New Zealand and the Pacific Directorate
 Consular Directorate
 Corporate Affairs Directorate
 Europe Directorate
 Human Resource Directorate
 MFA Diplomatic Academy
 Information Management Directorate
 Internal Audit Unit
 International Economics Directorate
 International Organisations Directorate
 Middle East, North Africa and Central Asia Directorate
 Northeast Asia Directorate
 Protocol Directorate
 South Asia and Sub-Saharan Africa Directorate
 Southeast Asia I Directorate
 Southeast Asia II Directorate
 Strategic Communications Directorate
 Technical Cooperation Directorate

Overseas missions

Ministry of Health (MOH)

Committees/Councils
 Dental Specialist Accreditation Board
 Family Physicians Accreditation Board
 Optometrists and Opticians Board
 Pharmacy Specialist Accreditation Board
 Specialist Accreditation Board
 Allied Health Professions Council

Departments/Divisions
 Agency for Integrated Care
 Alexandra Hospital
 Changi General Hospital
 Institute of Mental Health
 KK Women's and Children's Hospital
 Khoo Teck Puat Hospital
 MOH Office for Healthcare Transformation
 National Cancer Centre Singapore
 National Centre for Infectious Diseases
 National Dental Centre Singapore
 National Healthcare Group
 National Healthcare Group Polyclinics
 National Heart Centre Singapore
 National Neuroscience Institute
 National Skin Centre
 National University Health System
 National University Hospital
 National University Polyclinics
 Ng Teng Fong General Hospital
 Sengkang General Hospital
 Singapore Gamma Knife Centre
 Singapore General Hospital
 Singapore Health Services
 Singapore National Eye Centre
 SingHealth Polyclinics
 Tan Tock Seng Hospital
 Woodlands Health Campus

Statutory boards
 Health Promotion Board
 Health Sciences Authority
 Singapore Dental Council
 Singapore Medical Council
 Singapore Nursing Board
 Singapore Pharmacy Council
 TCM Practitioners Board

Ministry of Home Affairs (MHA)

Councils
 National Council Against Drug Abuse
 National Crime Prevention Council
 National Fire Prevention and Civil Emergency Preparedness Council
 Presidential Council for Religious Harmony

Departments
 Central Narcotics Bureau
 Home Team Academy
 Immigration and Checkpoints Authority
 Internal Security Department
 Singapore Civil Defence Force
 Singapore Police Force
 Singapore Prison Service

Divisions
 Community Partnership & Communications Group
 Finance & Admin Division
 Gambling Regulatory Unit
 Human Resource Division
 Home Team Medical Services Division
 International Cooperation and Partnerships Division
 Legal Division
 Joint Operations Group
 Science & Technology Group
 Planning & Organisation Division
 Policy Development Division
 Technology and Logistics Division
 Registry of Societies
 Research & Statistics Division
 Risk Management and Audit Group
 Training and Competency Development Division
 Office of Chief Psychologist

Statutory boards
 Casino Regulatory Authority of Singapore (CRA)
 Home Team Science and Technology Agency (HTX)
 Singapore Corporation of Rehabilitative Enterprises (SCORE)

Ministry of Communications and Information (MCI)

Departments/Divisions
 Audit Unit
 Corporate Communications Division
 Corporate Development Division
 Cyber Security Agency (under PMO)
 Digital Readiness & Learning Division
 Economic Regulation Division
 Group Information Technology Division
 Industry Division
 Information Operations Centre
 Information Planning Office
 Information Policy Division
 Legal Services
 Media Division
 Public Communications Division
 REACH
 Research & Data Division
 Security & Resilience Division
 Senior Consultants
 Strategic Planning Division
 Transformation

Statutory boards
 Infocomm Media Development Authority
 National Library Board
 National Archives of Singapore
 Personal Data Protection Commission

Ministry of Law (MinLaw)

Committees/Councils
 Singapore Academy of Law (SAL)

Departments/Divisions
 Appeals Board (Land Acquisition)
 Community Legal Services Group
 Copyright Tribunals
 Corporate Services Divisions
 International & Advisory 
 Legal Policy
 Legal Services Regulatory Authority
 Policy Divisions

Statutory boards
 Intellectual Property Office of Singapore (IPOS)
 Singapore Land Authority (SLA)
 Land Surveyors Board (LSB)

Ministry of Manpower (MOM)

Departments/Divisions
 Corporate Services Group
 Foreign Manpower Management Division
 Income Security Policy Department
 International Manpower Division
 Labour Relations and Welfare Division 
 Manpower Planning and Policy Division
 Occupational Safety and Health Division
 Organisation Management Department
 Work Pass Division

Statutory boards
 Central Provident Fund Board
 Singapore Labour Foundation
 Workforce Singapore

Ministry of National Development (MND)

Committees
 Community Improvement Projects Committee
 Community Improvement Projects Executive Committee

Councils
 Aljunied–Hougang Town Council
 Ang Mo Kio Town Council
 Bishan–Toa Payoh Town Council
 Chua Chu Kang Town Council
 East Coast Town Council
 Holland–Bukit Panjang Town Council
 Jalan Besar Town Council
 Jurong–Clementi Town Council
 Marine Parade Town Council
 Marsiling–Yew Tee Town Council
 Nee Soon Town Council
 Pasir Ris–Punggol Town Council
 Sembawang Town Council
 Sengkang Town Council
 Tampines Town Council
 Tanjong Pagar Town Council
 West Coast Town Council

Departments/Divisions
 Corporate Development Division
 Housing Division
 Infrastructure Division
 Planning and Research Unit
 Strategic Planning Division

Statutory boards
 Board of Architects
 Building and Construction Authority (BCA)
 Council for Estate Agencies (CEA)
 Housing and Development Board (HDB)
 National Parks Board (NPB)
 Professional Engineers Board, Singapore
 Strata Titles Boards
 Urban Redevelopment Authority (URA)

Ministry of Social and Family Development (MSF)

Departments
 Early Childhood Development Agency
 Emergency Preparedness Unit
 Feedback Unit
 Organisational Development Unit

Divisions
 Communications and International Relations Division
 Community and Social Sector Development Division
 Elderly Development Division
 Family Development Division
 Finance And Facilities Division
 Human Resource Division
 Information Technology Division
 Rehabilitation & Protection Division
 Social Support Division
 Sports Division
 Strategic Policy And Research Division
 Youth Division

Statutory boards
 National Council of Social Service

Ministry of Sustainability and the Environment (MSE)

Departments/Divisions
 Energy & Climate Policy 
 Environmental Policy
 Water & Food Policy
 International Policy
 Communications & 3P Partnerships Division
 Futures & Planning
 Corporate Development
 Climate Change Negotiation Office

Statutory boards
 National Environment Agency (NEA)
 Public Utilities Board (PUB)
 Singapore Food Agency (SFA)

Ministry of Trade and Industry (MTI)

Departments/Divisions
 Capability Development Group
 Corporate Development Division
 Department of Statistics
 Directorate A, Trade Division
 Directorate B, Trade Division
 Economics Division
 Enterprise Division
 Industry Division
 International Business Development Division
 Resource Centre
 Resource Division
 Service Improvement Unit
 Special Project Unit

Statutory boards
 Agency for Science, Technology and Research (A*STAR)
 Competition and Consumer Commission of Singapore (CCCS)
 Economic Development Board (EDB)
 DesignSingapore Council
 Energy Market Authority (EMA)
 Enterprise Singapore (ESG)
 Hotels Licensing Board (HLB)
 JTC Corporation (JTC)
 Sentosa Development Corporation (SDC)
 Singapore Tourism Board (STB)

Ministry of Transport (MOT)

Departments/Divisions
 Air Transport Division
 Corporate Communications Division
 Corporate Development Division
 Futures and Transformation Division
 International Relations and Security Division
 Land Transport Division
 Sea Transport Division
 Transport Safety Investigation Bureau
 Technology Office

Statutory boards
 Civil Aviation Authority of Singapore (CAAS)
 Land Transport Authority (LTA)
 Maritime and Port Authority of Singapore (MPA)
 Public Transport Council (PTC)

Prime Minister's Office (PMO)

Committees/Councils
 Singapore Bicentennial Office

Departments/Divisions
 Communications Group
 Corrupt Practices Investigation Bureau
 Cyber Security Agency (Managed by MCI)
 Elections Department
 Horticultural Section
 Istana Maintenance Unit
 Istana Security Unit
 Justices of the Peace, Singapore
 National Research Foundation
 National Security Coordination Secretariat
 Public Service Division
 Smart Nation and Digital Government Office
 Strategy Group
 National Climate Change Secretariat (NCCS)
 National Population and Talent Division (NPTD)
 Public Sector Science and Technology Policy and Plans Office

Statutory Boards
 Civil Service College Singapore
 Monetary Authority of Singapore
 Government Technology Agency

Organs of State
 Attorney-General's Chambers (AGC)
 Auditor-General's Office (AGO)
 Cabinet of Singapore 
 The Istana
 Judiciary, Industrial Arbitration Court (IAC)
 Judiciary, Family Justice Courts 
 Judiciary, State Courts 
 Judiciary, Supreme Court
 Parliament of Singapore 
 Public Service Commission (PSC)

See also
Statutory boards of the Government of Singapore

External links
Singapore Government Website
Singapore Government Directory
Singapore Whitepages Government Numbers

 
Government of Singapore
Lists of government agencies